Manfred Grund (born 3 July 1955) is a German politician of the Christian Democratic Union (CDU).

Early life, education and career
Manfred Grund was born 3 July 1955 in Zeitz, East Germany (GDR). After earning his Abitur he worked as a turbine engineer at the State Coal Mine in Deuben before doing his military service from 1974 to 1975.

Grund earned a diploma degree (Dipl.-Ing.) in Electrical Engineering from the Dresden University of Technology in 1980. From 1980 to 1990 he worked as a specialist engineer with the Erfurt Public Utility Works at Bleicherode.

Political career
Without previous political affiliation Grund entered politics in the wake of the 1989 revolution in the GDR, in the course of which he acted as speaker of the Heiligenstadt people's movement. In January 1990 he joined the Christian Democratic Union and assumed various positions with the CDU in the Eichsfeld county and the state of Thuringia.

From 1990 to 1994 Grund served as head of the Heiligenstadt district administration authority.

In 1994 Grund was first elected to the German Bundestag for Nordhausen – Worbis – Heiligenstadt in Thuringia, a seat he has held ever since (renamed as Eichsfeld – Nordhausen – Kyffhäuserkreis in 2017).

Grund has served as parliamentary secretary of the CDU/CSU parliamentary group and as chairman of the Thuringian Committee of the CDU/CSU parliamentary group since 1998.

Current committee assignments
Council of Elders 
Committee on Foreign Affairs
Inter-Parliamentary Union (deputy member)
Parliamentary assembly of the Organization for Security and Co-operation in Europe (OSCE)

Chairmanships
Thuringian Committee of the CDU/CSU parliamentary group in the German Bundestag
German-Central Asian parliamentary group

Electoral history
Electoral district 296 Nordhausen – Worbis – Heiligenstadt, 1994 German federal election
-	Manfred Grund – 51.4%

Electoral district 190 Eichsfeld – Nordhausen, 1998 German federal election
-	Manfred Grund – 40.1%

Electoral district 190 Eichsfeld – Nordhausen, 2002 German federal election
-	Manfred Grund – 41.3%

Electoral district 190 Eichsfeld – Nordhausen – Unstrut-Hainich-Kreis I, 2005 German federal election
-	Manfred Grund – 37.4%

Electoral district 189 Eichsfeld – Nordhausen – Unstrut-Hainich-Kreis I, 2009 German federal election
-	Manfred Grund – 43.0%

Electoral district 189 Eichsfeld – Nordhausen – Unstrut-Hainich-Kreis I, 2013 German federal election
-	Manfred Grund – 49.6%

Electoral district 189 Eichsfeld – Nordhausen – Kyffhäuserkreis, 2017 German federal election
-	Manfred Grund – 38.0%

Personal life
Grund is a member of the Roman Catholic Church. He and his wife reside in Heiligenstadt, Thuringia.

References

1955 births
Living people
People from Zeitz
People from Bezirk Halle
Members of the Bundestag for Thuringia
TU Dresden alumni
Members of the Bundestag 2021–2025
Members of the Bundestag 2017–2021
Members of the Bundestag 2013–2017
Members of the Bundestag 2009–2013
Members of the Bundestag 2005–2009
Members of the Bundestag 2002–2005
Members of the Bundestag 1998–2002
Members of the Bundestag 1994–1998
Members of the Bundestag for the Christian Democratic Union of Germany